The 2016 Challenger Banque Nationale de Gatineau was a professional tennis tournament played on outdoor hard courts. It was the 1st edition of the tournament for men and the 3rd for women, and it was part of the 2016 ATP Challenger Tour and the 2016 ITF Women's Circuit, offering totals of $75,000 for men and $25,000 for women in prize money. It took place in Gatineau, Canada between August 8 and August 14, 2016.

Men's singles main-draw entrants

Seeds

1 Rankings are as of August 1, 2016

Other entrants
The following players received wildcards into the singles main draw:
 Filip Peliwo
 Brayden Schnur
 Denis Shapovalov
 Alejandro Tabilo

The following player entered the singles main draw with a protected ranking:
 Matija Pecotić

The following players received entry from the qualifying draw:
 Félix Auger-Aliassime
 Greg Jones
 Luis David Martínez
 Finn Tearney

The following players received entry as lucky losers:
 Pavel Krainik
 Samuel Monette

Women's singles main-draw entrants

Seeds

1 Rankings are as of August 1, 2016

Other entrants
The following players received wildcards into the singles main draw:
 Bianca Andreescu
 Petra Januskova
 Erin Routliffe
 Vanessa Wong

The following players received entry from the qualifying draw:
 Isabelle Boulais
 Lizette Cabrera
 Jessica Failla
 Dasha Ivanova
 Nika Kukharchuk
 Alexandra Morozova
 Charlotte Robillard-Millette
 Kristina Smith

The following player received entry as a lucky loser:
 Anne-Sophie Courteau

Champions

Men's singles

 Peter Polansky def.  Vincent Millot, 3–6, 6–4, ret.

Women's singles

 Bianca Andreescu def.  Ellie Halbauer, 6–2, 7–5

Men's doubles

 Tristan Lamasine /  Franko Škugor def.  Jarryd Chaplin /  John-Patrick Smith, 6–3, 6–1

Women's doubles

 Bianca Andreescu /  Charlotte Robillard-Millette def.  Mana Ayukawa /  Samantha Murray, 4–6, 6–4, [10–6]

External links
Official website 

Challenger Banque Nationale de Gatineau
Challenger Banque Nationale de Gatineau
Challenger de Gatineau
Challenger Banque Nationale de Gatineau